Mikyla Grant-Mentis (born July 15, 1998) is a Canadian ice hockey forward, currently playing with the Buffalo Beauts of the Premier Hockey Federation (PHF). She is the all-time leading scorer of the Merrimack Warriors women's ice hockey team. In 2021, she became the first black player to win the PHF's Most Valuable Player award.

Playing career 

Grant-Mentis played four years of NCAA Division I ice hockey with the Merrimack Warriors of Merrimack College, a member institution of the Hockey East conference, located in North Andover, Massachusetts. On November 8 of her senior season, she had a four-point (two goals, two assists) game against Maine, becoming just the second player to surpass 100 points in Merrimack program history. She went on to score a hat-trick against Brown three weeks later and was recognized as the Hockey East Co-Player of the Month for November 2020. Her season totals distinguished her as the Warriors' leader in goals (20) and points (33), ranking second on the Hockey East goals leaderboard and top-10 in scoring nationally. In total, she scored 117 points (56 goals and 61 assists) in 137 games with the Warriors and is the program's all-time leading point scorer, all-time assists leader, and second all-time in goals.

Professional
At the end of February 2020, Grant-Mentis signed with the Buffalo Beauts to finish the 2019–20 NWHL season along with Merrimack teammate Léa-Kristine Demers. She scored three points (2 goal, 1 assist) in two regular season games and added another two points (1 goal, 1 assist) in the PHF playoffs semi-final qualification as the Beauts lost to the Connecticut Whale. She was named Player of the Week in her first week in the PHF.

In May 2020, she signed with the Toronto Six, joining the team ahead of their first season in the PHF. Her first PHF goal as a member of the Six took place in a January 24, 2021, contest versus the 2019 Clarkson Cup champion Minnesota Whitecaps. A 6–5 shootout loss, Grant-Mentis became the only Six player to score in the shootout round. She recorded the game-winning goal in the Six's first win in franchise history against the Boston Pride on January 26, coming back from a 1–0 deficit with a pair of third period goals by Brooke Boquist and Grant-Mentis. She become the most decorated player in a single PHF season, earning a record four accolades, including the first black player in league history to win the Most Valuable Player and Newcomer of the Year Award. Additionally, she was the leading scorer on the Six, which won the regular season title, and was tied as the league-leading scorer.

On May 9, 2022, Grant-Mentis signed a 1 year, $80 000 deal to return to the Buffalo Beauts. This deal made her to highest paid player in PHF history.

Personal life 
Grant-Mentis was born July 15, 1998, in Brampton, Ontario. She is the daughter of Sandra Grant-Mentis and James Mentis. Her father played ball hockey with Team Canada and Team West Indies, and remains active with the Brampton Express of the Greater Toronto Ball Hockey League. She has two siblings, Marquis and Tre.

Grant-Mentis holds a bachelor's degree in criminology from Merrimack College.

Career statistics 

Sources: Elite Prospects, USCHO

Awards and honors
 2021 NWHL Most Valuable Player
 2021 NWHL Newcomer of the Year
 2021 NWHL Foundation Award (Toronto Six representative)
 2021 NWHL Fans' Three Stars
 2020–21 NWHL most goals scored

References

External links
 

1998 births
Living people
People from Brampton
Ice hockey people from Ontario
Canadian women's ice hockey forwards
Black Canadian ice hockey players
Canadian expatriate ice hockey players in the United States
Merrimack Warriors women's ice hockey
Buffalo Beauts players
Toronto Six players